Norbert Klaar (born 12 October 1954) is a German sports shooter and Olympic champion. He won gold medal in the 25 metre rapid fire pistol at the 1976 Summer Olympics in Montreal.

References

1954 births
Living people
German male sport shooters
Shooters at the 1976 Summer Olympics
Olympic shooters of Germany
Olympic gold medalists for East Germany
Olympic medalists in shooting
Medalists at the 1976 Summer Olympics
People from Wittenberge
Sportspeople from Brandenburg
20th-century German people
21st-century German people